We Built a Fire is the second full-length album from Icelandic band Seabear.

Track listing
 "Lion Face Boy" (3:37)
 "Fire Dies Down" (4:36)
 "I'll Build You a Fire"
 "Cold Summer"
 "Wooden Teeth"
 "Leafmask"
 "Softship"
 "We Fell Off the Roof"
 "Warm Blood"
 "In Winter's Eyes"
 "Wolfboy"

genre: Indie folk, Indie pop, Baroque pop

References

2010 albums
Seabear albums